Tala wa Barfak is a district situated in the most southwestern part of Baghlan province, Afghanistan, and its capital is Tala wa Barfak village.

References

External links
AIMS District Map
District profile by the UNHCR (9 April 2002).

Districts of Baghlan Province